Suero Gundemáriz (flourished 968–991) was a Leonese count in the region of Galicia, notable mainly for leading the region in rebellion. He was married to Teodegonza, a relative of Rudesind, founder of the monastery of Celanova. He was probably a brother of Piniolo Gundemáriz and thus an uncle of Count Gundemaro Pinióliz.

Little is known of Suero's early life. His earliest appearance in the historical record is as a witness in a document of 968 pertaining to the monastery of Sobrado. He attended the court of King Ramiro III in 974, witnessing two royal diplomas. In 985–86, he witnessed five diplomas of King Vermudo II, all pertaining to churches in León proper and Galicia. His interests clearly lay in eastern Galicia; and not a single document places him in Portugal.

In 986, Suero led a revolt against the King Vermudo II. He was joined by Count Gonzalo Menéndez and Osorio Díaz. This rebellion disturbed a peace which, as King Vermudo had proudly declared, reigned throughout the length and breadth of the kingdom as of 1 January 986. It also coincided with an invasion from the south by the Caliphate under al-Mansur. During the revolt, Suero managed to build a villa without royal permission at Veyga on the river Miño. In 994, after Suero's death, King Vermudo gave the villa to the monastery of Celanova. In documenting this gift, the king recorded how Suero, "puffed up with pride and led by a malicious spirit, rebelled against me and disturbed my land and my rights equally and my castles too, as did his other accomplices, whom he led against me." A document dated 1032, from the reign of King Vermudo III, describes the revolt led by Suero during the time of his grandfather (Vermudo II). It says that Suero held the fortress of Lugo and that the rebels built many illegal castles, all of which save for Lapio (now Labio) were torn down after the rebellion was defeated.

Suero made his peace with the king in 988, and was re-admitted to the royal court. Despite the fact that his rebellion was remembered for decades on account of its gravity, he was shown tremendous leniency, although his lands were at least partially confiscated. On 23 December 988, in a royal diploma for Celanova, he appears atop the list of lay witnesses. On 1 March 991, in his last appearance in the records, he confirms Vermudo II's grant of the conmiso (district) of Mera to the cathedral of Lugo. He died later that year. On 10 August 992, some estates that had been confiscated after the rebellion were conferred on his widow. His widow was alive as late as 18 December 1016, when she donated half the villa of Meilán to the cathedral of Lugo. One of Suero's nephews, Rodrigo Romániz, led a rebellion from the region of Monterroso during the reign of King Vermudo III, and seized the castle of Lapio.

Notes

References

Sources

991 deaths
Spanish nobility